Treasure Mountain may refer to:
 Treasure Mountain!, a computer game
 Treasure Mountain (Colorado), a mountain peak

See also
Monte Tesoro
 Treasure Hill
 Treasure Hill (White Pine County, Nevada)